Blackwell Miners Welfare F.C. was a football club based in Blackwell, Derbyshire, England. They played in the East Midlands Counties League up to the end of the 2011–12 season, when in July 2012 the football club announced its intention to withdraw from the league following problems with Blackwell Miners Welfare committee.

References

External links

Defunct football clubs in Derbyshire
Bolsover District
1890 establishments in England
Association football clubs established in 1890
2012 disestablishments in England
Association football clubs disestablished in 2012
East Midlands Regional League
Central Midlands Football League
East Midlands Counties Football League
Mining association football teams in England
Defunct football clubs in England